is a Japanese manga series by Shohei Manabe. The series was serialized in Shogakukan's Weekly Big Comic Spirits magazine from May 2004 to May 2019. It was adapted into a live action television drama series in 2010 and into a live action film in 2012. A second live action film, Ushijima the Loan Shark 2, was released on May 16, 2014. Two other live action films, Ushijima the Loan Shark 3, and Ushijima the Loan Shark The Final have also been released.

In 2011, the series won the 56th Shogakukan Manga Award for general manga.

Plot 
The story depicts the daily lives of Kaoru Ushijima, the manager of the ultra-violent, 10-day, 50% interest black-market finance company "Cow Cow Finance," and his employees, as well as the various human situations of the customers who visit Cow Finance and their relations, and the dark side of society. The story is told from the viewpoint of the main characters in each episode, and Ushijima is a kind of a rhapsodist who comes into contact with these characters. Therefore, there are many episodes in which Ushijima does not appear at all [Note 2]. The title "XX-kun" was inspired by the naming of automatic contracting machines for salaries, such as "Mujinkun" (Acom) and "O-auto-san" (Aiful), which were popular at the time.

Characters
 Takayuki Yamada (TV drama and film) as Kaoru Ushijima
 Nana Katase (TV drama and film) as Chiaki Okubo
 Kyosuke Yabe (TV drama and film) as Ezaki
 Hiromi Sakimoto (TV drama and film) as Takada
 Jessica Kizaki (TV drama and film) as Moko

Production
According to the author, in order to prevent mannerisms, he depicts the story from the viewpoint of the central character as much as possible. He said, "I try to keep the story as simple as possible.

As for the reason for ending the serialization, the author stated, "I felt that there was a limit to the story depicted from the perspective of a criminal, a black-money trader. The more I pushed the story, the more readers would leave. After that, he began serializing "Kujo no Daishin" (The Deadly Sins of the Nine), with a lawyer as the main character.

Media

Manga
Written and illustrated by Shohei Manabe, Ushijima the Loan Shark was serialized in Shogakukan's seinen manga magazine Weekly Big Comic Spirits from May 10, 2004, to March 4, 2019. Shogakukan collected its chapters in forty-six tankōbon volumes, released from July 30, 2004, to May 30, 2019.

A spin-off manga by Yū Hayato, titled Nikumamushi Densetsu, began serialization on Shogakukan's Yawaraka Spirits manga service in February 2017.

A spin-off manga by Ōdō Yamazaki, titled Gaiden: Ramen Namerikawa-san, was serialized on the Yawaraka Spirits manga service between December 2017 and May 2019.

Another spin-off manga by Ōdō Yamazaki, titled Shōnen-in Ushijima-kun, will begin serialization on Shogakukan’s MangaONE app on January 30, 2023.

Drama
In 2010, the manga series was adapted into a TV drama.

Film
In 2012, the manga was adapted into a live-action film, with the cast and staff from the TV drama reprising their roles.

Reception
In 2011, the series won the 56th Shogakukan Manga Award in the general category.

As of March 2022, it has sold a total of 21 million copies.

References

External links
 Official film website 
 

2004 manga
Business in anime and manga
Japanese crime drama films
Japanese drama television series
Live-action films based on manga
Manga adapted into films
Seinen manga
Shogakukan manga
Winners of the Shogakukan Manga Award for general manga